Swiss Cottage Library is the central library in the public library service of the London Borough of Camden, housed in an architectural landmark building in Avenue Road designed by Sir Basil Spence. It has been Grade II Listed since 1997.

Background 

The Metropolitan Borough of Hampstead's first library, Kilburn Library was opened in 1894. Later in 1897, the borough's first central library was established: Finchley Road Central Library. Then known as Hampstead Central Library, this became Camden Arts Centre in 1965. By the 1950s the Central Library had served the same role since its establishment and was in need of expansion. After a refurbishment, the library was severely damaged during the Blitz in World War II, leaving it with only half the required capacity. The Borough desperately needing space for books and incoroporated a new library into its plans for a new civic centre to house its headquarters and other services. The Library Association reported in 1959 that, whilst hardly any new public library buildings had been built, library usage has risen by 75% since 1939, with most buildings being over 50 years old. Post-war, the British government had prioritised housing and education, resulting in archaic building regulations remaining unamended, and many libraries being built for fewer users than needed. With additional damage and destruction to other libraries, Hampstead lacked the infrastructure needed for storing and cataloguing media.

History

Founding 
Swiss Cottage Library was constructed as part of the Swiss Cottage Centre development by the Metropolitan Borough of Hampstead in the 1950s. In 1959, British architect Sir Basil Spence created a scheme for the Civic Centre, including a library and Swiss Cottage Sports Centre. The dissolving of the Metropolitan Borough of Hampstead into the larger London Borough of Camden as part of the London Government Act 1963 brought complications to the scheme, with Camden Council instead wanting to focus on its Euston Road developments; Spence described the fate of the project as being "in the lap of the Gods". As Hampstead's final major infrastructure project, the original masterplan was downgraded to simply include a sports centre and library. Furthermore, the library, which was originally intended to be built next to Winchester Road, was instead moved to be beside Avenue Road. Queen Elizabeth II opened the library as Hampstead Public Library on the 10 November 1964, the same week in which she opened a library for the University of Sussex, also designed by Basil Spence. On opening, the library superseded Finchley Road Library as Hampstead's Central Library. Present at the opening were Councillor Luigi Carlo Denza, then Mayor of Hampstead, Basil Spence and Sir Edwin McAlpine, acting head of the library's construction firm at the time.

Construction 
Construction was undertaken by McAlpine & Sons and accelerated by the use of a  P200 Pingon tower crane, the tallest in the UK at the time. Hampstead's mayor got into a bulldozer on the first day of construction to shovel the first pile of earth. Due to heavy snow which meant additional protection was needed for the concrete, as well as building strikes, construction was delayed but eventually finished in 1964.

Expansion 
Camden Council announced in the late 1990s that it intended to regenerate Swiss Cottage Centre, and in 2003 refurbished Swiss Cottage Library to include a children's library, accessibility facilities and the removal of asbestos. The plan, including the demolition of Swiss Cottage Sports Centre and construction of Swiss Cottage Leisure Centre, designed by Sir Terry Farrell, was finished in 2007 at a cost of £85 million. Camden originally planned to demolish the library with Swiss Cottage Sports Centre, but was forced to instead refurbish it as a result of English Heritage designating it with a Grade II listing in December 1997. Following the library's refurbishment, the Council acknowledged that demolition "would have been a mistake". Later, Camden Council sued developers John McAslan & Partners for £500,000 as a result of delays in supply and a cost increase in the contract by £1.5 million. McAslan defended the delays, claiming "It was less than 10% late, which is nothing", and commenting on additional removals needing to be carried out.

Architecture 

Built in the Modernist style of the 1960s, similar to other contemporary civic buildings, Spence took from the vast open-space and minimalism of Scandinavian libraries, visiting Scandinavia to take notes on the designs.

Exterior 
The exterior of the library features 238 narrow 2-tonne "fins" made from Portland stone designed to control light whilst also serving to prevent noise pollution. These fins help prevent strong sunlight from affecting reading inside, and also resemble the leaves of a book.

Commentary 
The library's refurbishment was acclaimed by English Heritage as "a success in both architectural and heritage terms". Historic England also commented on the refurbishment, remarking that the library was one of the few post-war libraries that has been "sensitively refurbished".. Speaking to thousands of people at its opening, the Queen said to Spence that the library was "really wonderful" and that Hampstead was "so interesting". She heralded the specialised facilities available for readers in the library as well as accessibility measures for the disabled.

Notes

References

External links
 
 Official website
 

Library buildings completed in 1964
Public libraries in London
Libraries in the London Borough of Camden
Grade II listed buildings in the London Borough of Camden
Grade II listed library buildings
Basil Spence buildings
Swiss Cottage